Tabernaemontana stenosiphon is a species of plant in the family Apocynaceae. It is endemic to São Tomé Island.

References

stenosiphon
Flora of São Tomé Island
Endemic flora of São Tomé and Príncipe
Near threatened flora of Africa
Taxonomy articles created by Polbot